{{DISPLAYTITLE:C6H6O2S}}
The molecular formula C6H6O2S (molar mass: 142.18 g/mol, exact mass: 142.0089 u) may refer to:

 3,4-Ethylenedioxythiophene (EDOT)
 Phenylsulfinic acid
 3-Thiophene acetic acid
 Thiophene-2-acetic acid